The Žitava is a river in southern Slovakia. It is the left tributary of the river Nitra. It flows into the Nitra near Šurany. The old branch of the Žitava, Stará Žitava, branches off near Dolný Ohaj and flows into the old branch of the Nitra near Martovce.

Etymology
The name comes from Slavic žito: grain, corn. Žitava: probably "the river flowing through the grain fields".

See also
 Peace of Zsitvatorok (or Žitava)

References

Rivers of Slovakia